Wang Xiaohong (born November 20, 1968 in Changzhou, Jiangsu) is a female Chinese swimmer. She competed in two consecutive Summer Olympics for her native country, starting in 1988. She won the silver medal in the women's 200m butterfly event at the 1992 Summer Olympics in Barcelona, Spain.

References
 sports-reference

1968 births
Living people
Chinese female butterfly swimmers
Chinese female freestyle swimmers
Swimmers from Jiangsu
Olympic silver medalists for China
Olympic swimmers of China
Sportspeople from Changzhou
Swimmers at the 1988 Summer Olympics
Swimmers at the 1992 Summer Olympics
Asian Games medalists in swimming
World Aquatics Championships medalists in swimming
Swimmers at the 1990 Asian Games
Medalists at the 1992 Summer Olympics
Olympic silver medalists in swimming
Universiade medalists in swimming
Asian Games gold medalists for China
Asian Games silver medalists for China
Medalists at the 1990 Asian Games
Nanjing Sport Institute alumni
Universiade gold medalists for China
Universiade silver medalists for China
Medalists at the 1991 Summer Universiade
Medalists at the 1993 Summer Universiade
20th-century Chinese women